Fuad Salayev is an Azerbaijani sculptor.

He was born in 1943. He graduated from Azerbaijan State Art School named after A. Azimzade and he goes on to Moscow and graduated from Surikov Moscow Art Institute. He was involved in many exhibitions of the Soviet Union, and he had a lot of creative projects with the Russian Academy of Arts. 
He created the monument of Sergei Yesenin which was his first major work. But the poet's monument in Russia at that time was not raised yet.
He is also the vice-rector of the Academy of Arts now. He is the People's Artist. Fuad Salayev was honoured with Shohrat Order. Professor Fuad Salayev was named an academician of the Russian Academy of Arts.

References

External links
 Dövlət Rəssamlıq Akademiyasında “Ümid” satış-sərgisi açılıb (FOTOLENT)
 İçəri Şəhərdə Tahir Salahovun yaradıcılığına həsr olunmuş sərginin açılışı keçirilmişdir
 

1943 births
Living people
Artists from Baku
20th-century Azerbaijani sculptors
21st-century Azerbaijani sculptors